Bear Creek, California may refer to:

Communities
Bear Creek, Merced County, California
Bear Creek, San Joaquin County, California

Creeks
Bear Creek (San Francisquito Creek tributary), San Mateo County, California
Bear Creek (Santa Ana River tributary), San Bernardino Mountains, San Bernardino County, California
Bear Creek (Colusa County), a tributary of Cache Creek and ultimately the Sacramento River in the Inner Coastal Ranges